Jasin Ferati (born 2 August 2003) is a Swiss racing driver with Macedonian Albanian parents from Gostivar. He is the reigning Porsche Sports Cup Suisse champion, having previously competed in the Formula Regional European Championship.

Career

Karting 
Ferati made his karting debut in the Swiss Karting Championship in 2016, where he finished 13th. He then finished second in the X30 Junior class the following year, losing out to Mike Müller by 131 points. The Swiss driver made his first appearance at the CIK-FIA Karting European Championship, where he finished 43rd with the Schumacher Racing Team. He stayed in karts until 2019, where he also competed in the Karting World Championship.

Lower formulae 
Ferati made his car racing debut in the 2020 Italian F4 Championship with Jenzer Motorsport, driving alongside Filip Ugran. He scored a best finish of eleven twice, in Misano and Imola respectively, and finished the season 29th in the standings, with no points to his name. He was more successful in the Rookies' championship, where he amassed a total of twelve points and finished 19th in the end results.

Formula Regional European Championship 
In February 2021 it was announced that Ferati and Pietro Delli Guanti would be competing for Monolite Racing in the Formula Regional European Championship. In the first round at Imola Ferati finished 22nd in race 1, but spun out into the gravel in the second race. After eight races which included five retirements and a DNQ, he and Monolite decided to part ways during the Zandvoort round. Ferati later signed with KIC Motorsport prior to the following meeting at Spa-Francorchamps.

Sportscar racing 
Ferati made a full-time switch to sportscar racing in 2022, racing in the Porsche Sports Cup Suisse for the Fach Auto Tech team. With six race wins from 12 races, he took the GT3 Cup premier class title, following a season-long battle with series veteran Jürg Aeberhard.

Karting record

Karting career summary

Racing record

Racing career summary

* Season still in progress.

Complete Italian F4 Championship results 
(key) (Races in bold indicate pole position) (Races in italics indicate fastest lap)

Complete Formula Regional European Championship results 
(key) (Races in bold indicate pole position) (Races in italics indicate fastest lap)

Complete Porsche Sports Cup Suisse results 
(key) (Races in bold indicate pole position) (Races in italics indicate fastest lap)

References

External links 
 

2003 births
Living people
Swiss racing drivers
Italian F4 Championship drivers
Formula Regional European Championship drivers
People from Winterthur
Sportspeople from the canton of Zürich
Monolite Racing drivers
Jenzer Motorsport drivers
Spanish F4 Championship drivers
KIC Motorsport drivers
Karting World Championship drivers
Swiss people of Albanian descent
Swiss people of Macedonian descent